The Buffalo Bisons (1979–present) are a minor league baseball team, member of the International League from 1998–2020 and the Triple-A East from 2021–present.

Buffalo Bisons may also refer to:

Baseball 
 Buffalo Bisons (1886–1970), former minor league baseball team, member of the International League 1912–1970
 Buffalo Bisons (IA), former baseball team in the International Association in 1878, 1887 and 1888
 Buffalo Bisons (NL), former baseball team in the National League from 1879 to 1885
 Buffalo Bisons (PL), former baseball team in the Players League in 1890

Basketball 

 Buffalo Bisons (ABL), team in the American Basketball League in  1925–26
 Buffalo Bisons (NBL), team in the National Basketball League in 1946; now the Atlanta Hawks

Football 

 Buffalo Bisons (NFL), team in the National Football League in 1924–25, 1927 and 1929
 Buffalo Bisons (AAFC), former team in the All-America Football Conference in 1946, then renamed the Buffalo Bills

Ice hockey 

 Buffalo Bisons (IHL), former minor professional hockey team that played from 1928 to 1936
 Buffalo Bisons (AHL), former American Hockey League team that played from 1940 to 1970

College sports 

 Former name of the Buffalo Bulls athletic teams of the University at Buffalo, in use from 1915 to 1930